Boğazkere (Kurdish: Şerabî) is a grape variety and a Turkish wine originated from Diyarbakır Province near the Tigris river in the southeastern region of Turkey. It is a dark red rich grape and the wine is well structured with dried fruit and fig flavors. It also gives its name to a wine produced from the grape by the certificated Boğazkere vineyards in Diyarbakır.

The characteristics of this wine are strong body, long finish, dark red color with dark blue hue, and rich and strong aromas of dried red fruits and spices. It is good for aging up to 10 years. It is recommended with red meat kebabs, turkey, salmon and cheese, especially eastern Anatolian cheddar or Gruyere cheese.

See also
 Öküzgözü
 Çalkarası
 Kalecik Karası
 Papazkarası

References

Grape varieties of Turkey
Turkish words and phrases
Red wine grape varieties